The 2012 SMU Mustangs football team represented Southern Methodist University in the 2012 NCAA Division I FBS football season as members of Conference USA in the West Division. June Jones led the Mustangs in his fifth season. The Mustangs played home games in University Park, Texas (an enclave of Dallas, Texas) at Gerald J. Ford Stadium. This was SMU's last year as a member of Conference USA as they will join the Big East Conference in 2013. They finished the season 7–6, 5–3 in C-USA play to finish in second place in the West Division. They were invited to the Hawaii Bowl where they defeated Fresno State.

Preseason

Award watch lists
Darius Johnson : Biletnikoff Award
Ja'Gared Davis : Butkus Award
Blake McJunkin : Rimington Trophy
Zach Line : Doak Walker Award

Weekly Awards
  Kevin Pope  Named Conference USA Special Teams Player of the Week.
 Kenneth Acker Named Conference USA Defensive Player of the Week.
 Randall Joyner Named Conference USA Defensive  Player of the Week.

Coaching changes

Schedule

Game summaries

@ Baylor

Sources:

Stephen F. Austin

Sources:

Texas A&M

TCU

@ UTEP

@ Tulane

Houston

Memphis

@ UCF

Southern Miss

@ Rice

Tulsa

Fresno State–Hawaii Bowl

References

SMU
SMU Mustangs football seasons
Hawaii Bowl champion seasons
SMU Mustangs football